Kichha Legislative Assembly constituency is one of the 70 assembly constituencies of Uttarakhand. It is a part of Udham Singh Nagar district.

Members of Legislative Assembly

Election results

2022

2017

See also
 Rudrapur–Kichha (Uttarakhand Assembly constituency)
 List of constituencies of the Uttarakhand Legislative Assembly
 Udham Singh Nagar district

References

External link
  
 Kichcha constituency assembly election winner 2017: Rajesh Shukla from BJP wins; CM Harish Rawat from Congress loses
 Kichha Election Results 2017 : Rajesh Shukla From BJP Wins

Udham Singh Nagar district
Assembly constituencies of Uttarakhand